The Natural History Museum Vienna is a large natural history museum located in Vienna, Austria. It is one of the most important natural history museums worldwide.

The NHM Vienna is one of the largest museums and non-university research institutions in Austria and an important center of excellence for all matters relating to natural sciences. The museum's 39 exhibition rooms cover 8,460 square meters and present more than 100,000 objects. It is home to 30 million objects available to more than 60 scientists and numerous guest researchers who carry out basic research in a wide range of topics related to human sciences, earth sciences, and life sciences.

The Index Herbariorum code assigned to this museum is W and it is used when citing housed herbarium specimens.

History 

The history of the Natural History Museum Vienna is shaped by the passion for collecting of renowned monarchs, the endless thirst for knowledge of famous scientists, and the spirit of adventure of travelling researchers. True to the spirit of the inscription carved into the front of the museum, scientists at the NHM Vienna have over the centuries dedicated themselves and their work "to the realm of nature and its exploration".

While in the 19th century this was expressed through major imperial research expeditions to little-known corners of the Earth, today it can be found in modern DNA analysis methods and meteorite research providing insights into unfamiliar worlds and the outer extremes of our cosmos.

The earliest collections of the Natural History Museum Vienna date back more than 250 years. It was the Holy Roman Emperor Francis I, Maria Theresa’s husband, who in 1750 purchased what was at the time the world's largest and most famous collection of natural history objects from the Florentine scholar and scientist Jean de Baillou. This was the first step on the road to creating the Natural History Museum Vienna.

Baillou's collection comprised 30,000 objects, including rare fossils, snails, mussels, and corals, as well as valuable minerals and precious stones.

Emperor Francis, who founded the Schönbrunn zoo in 1752 and the botanical garden in 1753, also organized the first scientific overseas expedition. In 1755 he commissioned Nicolaus Joseph Jacquin to travel to the Caribbean, the Antilles, Venezuela, and Colombia. Jacquin returned from this expedition with many live animals and plants for the zoo and the botanical garden, as well as 67 cases full of other items of interest from the natural world.

After the Emperor's death, Maria Theresa gave the natural science collection to the state and opened it up to the general public. Thus she created the first museum in line with the principles and visions of the Enlightenment.

It was Maria Theresa who brought the famous mineralogist Ignaz von Born to Vienna. Born, who had developed a new method of extracting precious metals, was tasked with classifying and expanding the collections. To this end he had minerals from many different regions sent to Vienna, where they were added to the collection. Under the leadership of Ignaz von Born the cabinet of natural history quickly developed into a center of practical research.

Expeditions

Expedition to the Brazilian rainforests 
To mark the marriage of his daughter Leopoldine to the heir to the Portuguese throne, Dom Pedro, Emperor Francis II sponsored a scientific expedition to her new home country of Brazil in 1817. Two Austrian frigates accompanied the archduchess on her journey to Rio de Janeiro.

Those taking part in the expedition, carried out under the scientific direction of the head of the history collection, included the researchers Johann Mikan and Johann Emmanuel, as well as the taxidermist Johann Natterer and the landscape painter Thomas Ender. The expedition lasted 18 years and aimed to collect all plants, animals, and minerals of scientific interest and bring them back to Vienna.

The Novara sails the globe 
The most ambitious Austrian expedition was carried out by the SMS Novara, a frigate which sailed the world between 1857 and 1859. The scientific responsibility for this expedition was shared by the Academy of Sciences and the Geography Society. The man behind the project was Archduke Ferdinand Maximilian, Commander in Chief of the Austrian Navy.

Among the advisors was the famous naturalist and researcher Alexander von Humboldt. Many well-known scientists took part in the two-year journey, including the geologist Ferdinand von Hochstetter, ethnologist Karl von Scherzer and zoologist Georg Ritter von Frauenfeld. The entire journey was documented in hundreds of sketches and paintings by the landscape artist Josef Selleny. The scientists returned home with a vast haul of minerals, animals, plants and items of ethnological interest.

The Admiral Tegetthoff travels into the ice 
The last significant research expedition of the 19th century was the Austro-Hungarian North Pole expedition (1872–1874) led by Julius von Payer and Carl Weyprecht. On August 30, 1873, the participants on board discovered Franz Joseph Land.

With the main ship, the 220-ton Admiral Tegetthoff, at risk of breaking up under the pressure of the ice, the members of the expedition were forced to leave the ship. On May 20, 1874, they began their long retreat to the south, transporting their equipment and provisions on sleds and boats. Despite many sacrifices and great danger, the scientists returned to Vienna with both their invaluable travel journals and observations of the landscape, as well as a number of natural history items of interest welded into metal cases.

Directors
From 1876, Superintendents:
 1876–1884 Ferdinand von Hochstetter
 1885–1896 Franz von Hauer
 1896–1897 no superintendent, but temporary director: Franz Steindachner
 1898–1919 Franz Steindachner

From 1919, Chairmen of the Museum Council:
 1919–1922 Ludwig Lorenz von Liburnau
 1923–1924 Franz Xaver Schaffer

From 1924, First Directors:
 1925–1932 Hans Rebel
 1933–1938 Hermann Michel
 1938–1939 Otto Pesta, Acting Director
 1939–1945 Hans Kummerlöwe, "First Director of the Scientific Museums in Vienna"
 1945–1951 Hermann Michel
 1951–1962 Hans Strouhal
 1963–1971 Karl Heinz Rechinger
 1972–1978 Friedrich Bachmayer
 1979–1987 Oliver Paget
 1987–1994 Heinz A. Kollmann

From 1994: Directors General
 1994–2009 Bernd Lötsch
 January 1, 2010 – May 31, 2010 Herbert Kritscher, Acting Director
 2010–2020 Christian Köberl, Director General and chief executive officer

From June 2020:
 Katrin Vohland, Director General and chief executive officer

The building 

The Natural History Museum and the Museum of Fine Arts were commissioned by Emperor Franz Joseph I (1830–1916) and designed by the architects Gottfried Semper (1803–1879) and Carl Hasenauer (1833–1894). The two museums have identical exteriors and face each other. They were originally designed to be part of a much larger project – an Imperial Forum – which was never realized in full. Work on the Natural History Museum lasted from 1871 until 1881. On August 10, 1889, Emperor Franz Joseph himself officially opened the museum. Its façade, designed by Gottfried Semper, shows figures and statues representing progress in the field of natural sciences and the power of nature. Below the dome, the imperial dedication in golden letters reads: "To the realm of nature and its exploration".

Architecture 
The historicism style of art and architecture was very popular in 19th century Austria.

The Natural History Museum Vienna incorporates stylistic elements from many past periods, in particular the Renaissance. Work began on the building in 1871 and the facade was finished in 1881. It is around 170 meters long and 70 meters wide, comprising two courtyards that are each surrounded by working and exhibition rooms. The roof is crowned with a 65 m dome bearing a huge bronze statue of the Greek sun god Helios, a symbol of the life-giving element without which nature would not exist. The upper and middle levels (mezzanine and first floor) of the intricately decorated facade display allegorical and mythological figures representing key elements of the universe and its discovery and understanding by man. On the balustrade visitors can see sculptures of famous researchers and scientists who represent the continuing progress of human knowledge. These fundamental ideas are also the basis for the sculptures and paintings in the Dome Hall and the grand staircase; the highlight here is Hans Canon's ceiling fresco, The Circle of Life.

The internal structure of the building is dictated by the systematic organization of the exhibition and the individual departments. The mezzanine covers inanimate nature (Department of Mineralogy, Halls 1–5), sediments and traces of life early in Earth's history (Department of Geology & Paleontology, Halls 6–10), early human history (Department of Prehistory, Halls 11–13) and human development (Department of Anthropology, Halls 14–15). The first floor presents the huge diversity of the animal world (Zoological Departments, Halls 22–39) as well as the fascinating realm of the Earth's smallest organisms ("Microtheater", Hall 21). The exhibits themselves are displayed in a systematic order according to how closely they are related to each other or their chronological position in the history of Planet Earth or human beings.

Ceiling painting 
The 100 square-metre ceiling painting above the grand staircase depicts "The Cycle of Life." Hans Canon (1829–1885) had the freedom to choose his subject and painted a dramatic allegory of the rise and decline of humanity. In addition, humankind serving as the central theme of this painting further fulfills Hochstetter’s concept.

The cycle of growing and passing away in human existence is presented in a circular composition. It reflects the idea of the fight for existence, which dominated scientific thought at that time. At the same time the animal world was brought into this cycle as well: on one side "mankind made the Earth its servant" (it catches a catfish with its trident); on the other side, however, nature wins the upper hand (a vulture guards its prey). Nevertheless, mankind stands in the center of these events: a man, wrapped in a red cloth, holds an hourglass (presumably an allusion to Chronos, the god of time).

Exhibition area 

In 39 display halls with an area of 8,700 m2 the collections give an overview of the diversity of life on Earth. The order of the halls is based on the classification values of the 19th century: humans as the "apex of creation" were originally presented in a large part of the mezzanine with anthropology, ethnology, and prehistory.

On the first floor the visitor was to be guided from the "most simple" through to the "most consummate evolutionary animals". For this reason, the apes, as representatives of the primates, are found at the end of the tour.

This systematic concept of the collections has been preserved to the present even though today evolution is no longer seen as development toward perfection, but as development toward diversity.

The furnishings of the display halls, with display cases of dark, carved wood, are mostly originals from the opening days of the museum, from the plans of Ferdinand von Hochstetter.

This historical presentation of the collections is almost unique in the world today.

The mezzanine level 
The mezzanine is decorated with more than 100 oil paintings, illustrations which complement the objects displayed in the halls. Some halls are additionally decorated with figures.

This interplay between decoration and display objects gives the Natural History Museum Vienna is a unique artistic presentation.

The exhibitions on mezzanine level:

Halls 1–4: Mineralogy & Petrography

Hall 5: Meteorites

Halls 6–10: Paleontology

Halls 11–13: Prehistory Halls 14–15: Anthropology

Halls I–IV: Mineralogy & Petrography
The large public displays in halls I–V show aesthetic and scientifically valuable minerals, ores, gemstones, rocks (including decorative and building stones) as well as meteorites and impactites (including tektites) collected over more than 500 years. All objects are arranged in a systematic way and new objects are added each year. Special temporary exhibitions may be presented as well in individual halls.

The first four halls show the systematic mineral exhibit. Hall I contains large mineral samples (in a glass cabinet in the middle of the room), a collection of building materials (samples) and the first part of the systematic mineral exhibit. Hall II continues with sulphides, halogenides, oxides, hydroxides, nitrates, iodates and carbonates), in Hall III there are carbonates, borates, sulfates, chromates, phosphates, arsenates and vanadates.

Phosphates, arsenates and silicates, gemstones and the rock collection are exhibited in Hall IV. The collection of gems and precious stones can also be found in this hall. This collection is one of the most comprehensive and valuable of its kind to be found on the European continent. One cabinet contains significant specimens of most of the well-known jewelry material today, whereby the raw material and the half-finished stones are placed alongside the finished cut and polished stones together with pieces of original jewelry. Two side cabinets contain larger samples of the precious stones collection. The original rhinestone copy of the famous Florentine Diamond is kept in Hall IV.

Gallery

See also 
 Imperial Natural History Museum, the current museum's predecessor.

 Other major museums in Vienna
 Kunsthistorisches Museum, the Museum of Fine Art sitting opposite the Vienna Museum of Natural History.
 Lobkowitz Palace, housing the Kunsthistorisches Museum'''s theatrical department and the Austrian National Library. 
 Technisches Museum Wien'', the Museum of Technology.
 Museum of Ethnology

References

External links 

 Official website (English version)
 Annals, an early history of the museum.
 Exterior and interior photos of the museum at Flickr.
 Virtual tour of the museum
 Naturhistorisches Museum Wien at Google Cultural Institute

Hofburg
Museums in Vienna
Natural history museums in Austria
Mineralogy museums
Museums of Dacia
Geology museums in Austria
Shell museums
Buildings and structures in Innere Stadt
Cultural infrastructure completed in 1891
1889 establishments in Austria
Dinosaur museums
19th-century architecture in Austria